Seven ships of the Royal Navy have borne the name HMS Bristol, after the English port city of Bristol:

 was a 48-gun ship launched in 1653, completely rebuilt in 1693, captured by the French in April 1709, recaptured two weeks later and sunk.
 was a 54-gun fourth rate launched in 1711. She underwent a rebuild in 1746 which rearmed her with 50 guns, and was broken up in 1768.
 was a 50-gun fourth rate launched in 1775. She served in the American War of Independence, was used as a prison ship after 1794, and was broken up in 1810.
Bristol was originally the 64-gun third rate . She was renamed HMS Bristol when she became a prison ship in 1812. She was sold in 1814 for immediate breaking up.
 was a wooden screw frigate launched in 1861 and broken up in 1883.
 was a  light cruiser launched in 1910. She was the name ship of the Bristol subgroup and was sold in 1921.
  was a training establishment ('stone frigate') set up in House 4 of Muller's Orphanage in Bristol.

Battle honours
Santa Cruz 1657
Battle of Lowestoft 1665
Four Days' Battle 1666
Orfordness 1666
Sole Bay 1672
Battle of Texel 1673
Finisterre 1747
Falkland Islands 1914
Falkland Islands 1982

Citations

Royal Navy ship names